Le Bourg is a commune located in the Lot department and Occitanie region of southwestern France.

Population

See also
Communes of the Lot department

References

Communes of Lot (department)